Mahalia Violet Barnes (born 12 July 1982) is an Australian singer, songwriter and the daughter of Scottish-Australian rock singer Jimmy Barnes and Jane Mahoney. She began performing as part of children's pop group The Tin Lids with siblings, Eliza-Jane 'E.J.', Elly-May and Jackie, but has since become a session and backup singer in her own right. She most recently has sung backup for Joe Bonamassa in the studio, and live.

Biography
Mahalia Violet Barnes was born on 12 July 1982 in Sydney. She is the daughter of Jimmy Barnes (born James Swan, 28 April 1956 in Glasgow, Scotland) an Australian rock singer, and Jane Mahoney (born Jane Dejakasaya, 1958, Bangkok, Thailand), the stepdaughter of an Australian diplomat. The pair married in Sydney on 22 May 1981, Barnes was named after United States gospel singer, Mahalia Jackson.

When she was eight, Barnes joined younger siblings, Eliza-Jane 'E.J.' and Jackie for the recording sessions of their father's Two Fires album. Their voices are among the children's choir that features on the track "When Your Love is Gone". From the age of nine she formed part of the children's singing group The Tin Lids (after Glaswegian rhyming slang for "kids") with siblings Eliza-Jane 'E.J.', Elly-May and Jackie. The Tin Lids recorded three albums between 1991 and 1994, all of which achieved platinum sales. One of their albums, Snakes & Ladders (1992) was also nominated for the ARIA Award for Best Children's Album in 1993.

Barnes also has an older half-brother, David Campbell (born 6 August 1973, Adelaide), through her father.

Barnes performs regular live gigs around Australia and also backs other artists including R&B singer Jade MacRae, live Sydney band The Hands (whose members include session musicians Clayton and Lachlan Doley) and her father Jimmy. She has worked for MacRae, The Hands, Jimmy (including a duet, "Gonna Take Some Time", which was released as the second single from his album Double Happiness), Gary Pinto and her uncle Johnny Diesel (married to Jane's sister). She has also contributed to Reece Mastin and his Change Colours album.

Barnes's debut album Volume 1 with the Soul Mates was released in June 2008.

Barnes auditioned for the first season of the Australian version of The Voice with the song "Proud Mary", the episode of which was broadcast on 22 April 2012 on the Nine Network. All coaches pressed their buttons (the first was Keith Urban), then realised that she was in fact Jimmy Barnes's daughter. Mahalia chose to join Joel Madden's team. Mahalia was eliminated in the battle ring when she was pitted against Prinnie Stevens, who is very close to Mahalia.

Barnes became Reece Mastin's manager in early 2015, when he was signed to Social Family Records. She contributed to his Change Colours album. They had been friends before she became his manager, and he has worked closely with the whole Barnes family, with all of them making a cameo on his new record, including daughter Ruby Rodgers (6 years of age) with Ben Rodgers, the bassist on the record Change Colours. Rodgers also plays guitar and bass at his live performances.

In 2021, Barnes competed in the third season of the Australian version of the Masked Singer as the "Pavlova". She finished eighth after being eliminated in the fifth episode.

Discography

Albums

Extended plays

Singles

See also
 The Tin Lids

References

External links
 
 Official Myspace page

1982 births
Living people
Australian women singer-songwriters
Australian soul singers
Australian people of Scottish-Jewish descent
Australian people of Thai descent
The Voice (franchise) contestants
Singers from Sydney
Australian child singers
21st-century Australian women singers
Swan musical family
21st-century Australian singers
Australian children's musicians
Provogue Records artists